Château-Ville-Vieille (Vivaro-Alpine: Chastèu e Vilavielha) is a commune in the Hautes-Alpes department in southeastern France.

Geography
The commune is located in the Queyras.

The two villages in the commune lie in the Guil valley; Ville-Vieille on the left bank of the Guil and Château-Queyras on its right bank.

Population

See also
Communes of the Hautes-Alpes department

References

Communes of Hautes-Alpes